The Professor of Poetry is an academic appointment at the University of Oxford.  The chair was created in 1708 by an endowment from the estate of Henry Birkhead. The professorship carries an obligation to deliver an inaugural lecture; give one public lecture each term on a suitable literary subject; offer one additional event each term (which may include poetry readings, workshops, hosted events, etc.); deliver the Creweian Oration at Encaenia every other year; each year, to be one of the judges for the Newdigate Prize, the Jon Stallworthy Prize, the Lord Alfred Douglas Prize and the Chancellor’s English Essay Prize; every third year, to help judge the English poem on a sacred subject prize and generally to encourage the art of poetry in the University.

The professor is appointed to a single four-year term.   The Professor of Poetry Committee produces a shortlist of applicants to stand for election by members of the University of Oxford's Convocation. Convocation consists of members of the faculty (Congregation) both current and retired, and former student members of the university who have been admitted to a degree (other than an honorary degree). In 2010, on-line voting was allowed for the first time. The Professor of Poetry receives a stipend (£25,000 per annum as of 2023) which is increased in line with the annual cost-of-living increases for academic and related staff, plus £40 for each Creweian Oration.

Since 1708, 46 persons have been elected to the position including many prominent poets and academics. Alice Oswald, elected on 21 June 2019, is the current Professor of Poetry. She is the first woman to hold this post, although not the first woman elected to it, which was Ruth Padel, who resigned after nine days without fulfilling the obligations of the post. Oswald succeeded Simon Armitage on 1 October 2019, who held the professorship from 2015.

Elections
The elections typically attract media attention and involve campaigning by proponents of quite diverse candidates. In the past, both practising poets and academic critics have been chosen.

2009 election
On 16 May 2009, Ruth Padel defeated the Indian poet Arvind Mehrotra to become the first woman elected to the post since its inception in 1708. The Nobel Prize-winning candidate Derek Walcott had withdrawn his candidacy, following what he called a "low and degrading" campaign against him, after The Sunday Times and Cherwell revealed that around 100 Oxford academics had been sent, anonymously, photocopied pages from The Lecherous Professor, a University of Illinois publication on the prevalence of sexual harassment in American universities, describing two such accusations made against Walcott at Harvard University and Boston University. Walcott's candidacy had been controversial within the university from the beginning, some counselling against on grounds of Walcott's university past, others arguing that his record was immaterial since he would have no contact with students. Newspapers had previously claimed Walcott was the favourite, although Libby Purves suggested that this claim was based on a misunderstanding of the electoral system. Padel criticised the anonymous missives and denied any knowledge of them, though many in the media continued to insinuate her involvement. After her election, two journalists who had previously requested information from Padel regarding voters' opinions revealed that she had cited to them the source of some people's unease about the suitability for appointment of someone with such a university record. Padel stated, 'I wish he had not pulled out' and resigned on 25 May only nine days after her election.

Letters to British newspapers criticised media handling of the election. An open letter to the Times Literary Supplement, complained of unfair media pursuit of Walcott's past, a letter in The Guardian complained of unjust denigration of Padel, claiming she was "justly held in high regard" for her poetry and teaching, and a letter to The Times claimed that "Oxford has missed out for the worst of reasons. 'One can only speculate why so many male voices were loud in condemning Padel but silent with respect to Walcott. I attended a course taught by Ruth Padel: she was inspirational, involved, enthusiastic and interested in her students. Perhaps it was unwise of her to email journalists but if Walcott's past is "irrelevant to his suitability to fill the post of Professor of Poetry", so is Padel's "unwisdom". That Walcott removed the decision from the electorate was his own choice. Padel should not have been made to pay for his decision to confront neither his accusers nor his past." American commentators attributed the series of events to an assumption on the part of academics and writers that a gender war was behind it all, perceiving a "split across the Atlantic - with the Americans, the ones after all working with Walcott over the decades, taking those claims much more seriously"

Some commentators in Britain supported Padel, attributing the smear campaign in the media to misogyny and networking. "The old boys have closed in on her", the poet Jackie Kay stated. On Newsnight Review the poet Simon Armitage and poetry writer Josephine Hart expressed regret about Padel's resignation. "Ruth's a good person", Armitage said. "She dipped a toe in the media whirlpool and it dragged her down. I don't think she should have resigned, she would have been good." The election was for a post beginning the first day of Michaelmas Term 2009 hence Padel did not take up office. In the 2010 election she supported Geoffrey Hill.

2010 election

On 7 May 2010, the university, having changed its system of voting to embrace online voters, confirmed that Paula Claire, Geoffrey Hill, Michael Horovitz, Steve Larkin, Chris Mann and seven others had been nominated as candidates for the position.

Paula Claire, the only woman standing, announced her withdrawal on 7 June 2010, citing concerns about the fairness of the election which were dismissed by the university authorities.

On 18 June, Geoffrey Hill was declared elected. He received 1,156 votes; the next highest number, 353, went to Michael Horovitz.

2015 election
On 19 June 2015, Simon Armitage was elected as Geoffrey Hill’s successor.

Persons elected to the position (1708–present)

References

Further reading
Ricks, Christopher (2009) "Oxford University Professorship of Poetry": English Faculty news; issue 2, pp. 4-6

External links
Oxford Professor of Poetry
English Faculty site for Prof of Poetry

English poetry

Poetry
Professor of Poetry
Culture in Oxford
1708 establishments in England